Cetopsidium pemon is a species of whale catfish found in the Caroni River and the Caura River basins, southern tributaries of the Orinoco in eastern Venezuela, the Meta River basin of the western portions of the Orinoco system in eastern Colombia, and the upper portions of the Branco River in northern Brazil.

References 
 

Cetopsidae
Freshwater fish of Brazil
Freshwater fish of Colombia
Fish of Venezuela
Fish described in 2005